Thomas Campbell (10 August 1871 – 7 July 1950) was a New Zealand cricketer. He played one first-class match for Taranaki in 1894/95.

See also
 List of Taranaki representative cricketers

References

External links
 

1871 births
1950 deaths
New Zealand cricketers
Taranaki cricketers
Cricketers from Wellington City